Vijayanand is a 2022 Indian Kannada-language biographical film directed by Rishika Sharma, produced by Dr. Anand Sankeshwar under the banner of VRL Film productions a unit of VRL Media Pvt Ltd.The film is a based on the life of Indian businessman ,  Vijay Sankeshwar. The film stars Nihal, Bharat Bopanna, Anant Nag, Ravichandran, Prakash Belawadi, Anish Kuruvilla, Vinaya Prasad, Siri Prahlad. The music is composed  by Gopi Sundar.

Cast 
 Nihal as Vijay Sankeshwar
 Bharat Bopanna as Anand Sankeshwar
 Anant Nag as BG Sankeshwar
 Ravichandran as Ganesh Dada
 Prakash Belawadi
 Anish Kuruvilla as AJ
 Vinaya Prasad as Chandramma
 Siri Prahlad as Lalitha Sankeshwar
 Archana Kottige as Vani Sankeshwar

Production
Film was shot at various locations like Hubli, Dharwad, Gadag, Agadi Thota Konnur, RFC Hyderabad, Bangalore, Udupi, Kudremukh, BabaBudangiri, Halebidu, Melkote.The shooting began on October,2021. The movie's theatrical release is planned in November 2022 in Kannada,Hindi,Telugu,Tamil and Malayalam languages. Vijayanand movie is the first ever biopic from the Kannada Film Industry dubbed into other south and hindi languages.

Filming for Vijayanand started on 24 October 2021 in Hubli, with a grand muhurat puja ceremony in the presence of the entire Karnataka press. As of December 2021, the team completed 80% of the shoot. With the schedule being filmed in Hubli. A straight continuous schedule of 75 days was completed. The last leg of shoot was held in Hubli after the song sequences were shot at Kudremukh, Malpe beach etc. Total number of shoot days being 98 days, The film has more than 66 sets (art sets raised), Total number of artists were 245 with the background artists exceeding 5000.

Music 
The film's music is composed by music director Gopi Sundar. The music album rights are owned by Anand Audio, an Indian music record label company in Karnataka.

Marketing 
The first official teaser was released on 2 August 2022. The teaser was released in four languages. It became the most liked teaser and received a massive response with 2crore + YouTube views in all four languages. The trailer and movie is planned to be released in the month of October and November 2022.

References

External links 

2020s Kannada-language films
Indian biographical films
2022 films
2020s Indian films